Macromphaliinae is a subfamily of the moth family Lasiocampidae. The subfamily was first described by John G. Franclemont in 1973.

Genera
Apotolype Franclemont, 1973
Artace Walker, 1855
Hypopacha Neumoegen & Dyar, 1893
Macromphalia C. & R. Felder, 1874
Mesera Walker, 1855
Titya Walker, 1855
Tolype Hübner, [1820]
Tytocha Schaus, 1924

 
Lasiocampidae